The Battle of Nowo Schwerschen was fought on Friday, 13 November 1812, near , part of the Russian Empire at the time. An unexperienced Lithuanian force under General  was defeated by seasoned Russian forces led by Count Lambert from Admiral Chichagov's Army of the Danube.

Kossecki's forces were given the task of protecting Minsk from a southeast attack and ensure a path of retreat for Napoleon's Grande Armée.

Background 
Maret sent General Kossecki with about 3,000 infantry and 500 cavalry men to Nowo Schwerschen where they were to protect the crossing of the Niemen.

According to Smith, Kossecki's division was composed of:

 18th Lithuanian Infantry Regiment (one bn.)
 19th Lithuanian Infantry Regiment (one bn.)
 20th Lithuanian Infantry Regiment (one bn.)
 21st Lithuanian Infantry Regiment (one bn.)
 combined Cavalry regiment

Battle 
On November 13, Lambert arrived at Nowo Schwerschen with the Third Western Army's vanguard. Kossecki's raw Lithuanian recruits were driven off with heavy losses by the cavalry.

Aftermath 
The defeated detachment was once more attacked in the battle of Kaidanowo.

See also
List of battles of the French invasion of Russia

References

Sources

External links
 

Battles of the French invasion of Russia
Battles of the Napoleonic Wars
Battles involving France
Battles involving Lithuania
Battles involving Russia
Conflicts in 1812
November 1812 events
19th century in the Russian Empire
1812 in the Russian Empire